Cortez may refer to:

Places

United States
 Cortez, California, an unincorporated community in Merced County
 Cortez, Colorado, a city and county seat of Montezuma County
 Cortez, Florida, a census-designated place
 Cortez, Nevada, ghost town
 Cortez, Pennsylvania, an unincorporated community

Elsewhere
 Sea of Cortez or Gulf of California, in Mexico

Other uses 
  Cortez, an 1823 play by James Planché
 Cortez Motor Home, a Class-A motor coach made in the U.S. from 1963 to 1979
 Agnelli & Nelson or Cortez, trance music duo 
 Cortez, a character from The Longest Journey and Dreamfall
 Cortez, a type of running shoe from Nike

People

Surname
 Adrian T. Cortez (1978–2016), American trans woman and performer with the stage name Brittany CoxXx
 Alberto Cortez (1940–2019), Argentine singer and songwriter
 Alexandria Ocasio-Cortez (born 1989), American politician and educator
 Amado Cortez (1928–2003), Filipino actor and diplomat
 Antawn Cortez Jamison (born 1976), American basketball player
 Bella Cortez (born 1944), Cuban actress and dancer
 Carlos Cortez (1923–2005), American poet, artist and political activist
 Chris Cortez (born 1988), American soccer player
 Dave "Baby" Cortez (born 1938), American pop music and R&B musician
 Edgar Cortez (born 1989), Nicaraguan runner
 Fernando Cortez (born 1981), American basketball player
 Gregorio Cortez (1875–1916), Mexican folk hero
 Hernan Cortez (1485-1547), the Spanish Conquistador who led an expedition that caused the fall of the Aztec Empire
 Heidi Cortez (born 1981), American actress, model and writer
 Jayne Cortez (1936–2012), American poet
 Jhay Cortez (born 1993), Puerto Rican singer and rapper
 Joana Cortez (born 1979), Brazilian tennis player
 Jody Cortez (born c. 1960), American drummer
 Joe Cortez (born 1943), Puerto Rican boxing referee
 Jorge Cortez (born 1972), Panamanian baseball player
 José Cortez (born 1975), American football player
 José Luis Cortez (born 1979), Ecuadorian footballer
 Luís Cortez (born 1994), Portuguese footballer
 Manuel Cortez (born 1979), German–Portuguese actor
 Mike Cortez (born 1980), American basketball player
 Page Cortez (born 1961), American politician
 Paul E. Cortez, American soldier and war criminal
 Philip Cortez (born 1978), American politician
 Rafael Cortez (born 1976), Brazilian journalist, actor and comedian
 Raul Cortez (1932–2006), Brazilian actor
 Ricardo Cortez (1899–1977), American silent film actor
 Stanley Cortez (1908–1997), American cinematographer
 Viorica Cortez (born 1935), Romanian-born French mezzo-soprano

Given name
Cortez Broughton (born 1997), American football player
Cortez Gray (1916–1996), American basketball player
Cortez Kennedy (1968–2017), American football player

Fictional
 Fabian Cortez, a Marvel Comics supervillain
 Sergeant Cortez, protagonist of the TimeSplitters video game series
 Ian Cortez, a Cuban intelligence agent working for the Colombian Cartel in the novel/film Clear and Present Danger
 Henry Cortez, a character in the Millennium series of novels by Stieg Larsson
 Hotel Cortez, the setting of American Horror Story: Hotel
 Juni and Carmen Cortez, main protagonists in the Spy Kids franchise

See also 
 Cortes (disambiguation)
 Cortes (surname)